Belloy–Saint-Martin is a railway station in Belloy-en-France (Val d'Oise department), France.  It is on the Luzarches line 26.8 km from Gare de Paris-Nord. The railway station lies between the communes of Belloy-en-France and Saint-Martin-du-Tertre, near the hamlet of Les Briqueteries. It is served by Transilien line H trains from Paris to Luzarches. On a single track line the station has two tracks and platforms forming a passing loop.

In 2002 fewer than 500 passengers per day joined a train here.

Bus routes

Busval d'Oise: 95.09
CIF: 47

References

External links
 

Railway stations in Val-d'Oise
Railway stations in France opened in 1880